Weberbauerocereus johnsonii is a species of Weberbauerocereus from Peru.

References

External links
 
 

johnsonii
Flora of Peru